Diadema (uncommonly , Diadem) is a municipality in São Paulo state, Brazil. Belonging to the ABCD Region of Greater São Paulo, it is  distant from São Paulo's central point. Initially part of São Bernardo do Campo, Diadema became a city of its own in 1959. Its HDI is 0.790.

Although located in the heart of a traditionally industrial region, its main source of income is the service sector, featuring 77 healthcare installations. Diadema is home to a butterfly zoo, a botanical garden, an art museum and an observatory.

History 

Since its beginning, Diadema occupation process had one fundamental factor: its geographical location between the coast - Vila de São Vicente - and the plateau - Vila de São Paulo de Piratininga (São Paulo city early name). It was the existence of a connecting road between São Bernardo do Campo and Santo Amaro that provided ways for the early inhabitants to arrive to the neighborhoods in the early 18th century. The avenues that are now known as Antonio Piranga and Piraporinha were originated from this early roads.

Until the 1940s, Diadema was constituted by four neighborhoods belonging to São Bernardo do Campo: Piraporinha, Eldorado, Taboão e Vila Conceição. Dispersed, they were only connected through roads of difficult passage and each neighborhood had its own life. Piraporinha near São Bernardo; Taboão, also connected to São Bernardo do Campo due to the proximity and to São Paulo through Água Funda Avenue. Eldorado, a neighborhood that had unique characteristics, because of the Billings Reservoir, had a greater proximity to São Paulo, to the Santo Amaro region and finally Vila Conceição formed by the farms that once belonged to the Vila Conceição Company.

Education
The municipality has several higher education facilities: a campus of the Instituto Nacional de Estudos e Pesquisas Educacionais Anísio Teixeira, a branch of the São Paulo State Technological College, and a Serviço Nacional de Aprendizagem Industrial regional department.

The campus of the Universidade Federal de São Paulo, founded in 2007, provides degrees in chemistry, chemical engineering, pharmacy, and biology. Since 2009 an industrial chemistry degree was added and in 2010 a further two courses; in environmental sciences and a science licentiate degree (a combination of physics, mathematics, biology and chemistry).

Sport
EC Água Santa is the local association football club.

Notable people 
 Fernando Ramos da Silva (1967–1987), child actor who was killed by police.
 David Luiz (1987-), professional footballer who plays for Arsenal. He also played for Chelsea for 7 years, as well as spells with PSG, and Benfica. He is a former Brazil International.
 Denílson de Oliveira Araújo (1977-), retired footballer who played as a left winger.

See also 
 Santos FC
 Qatar

References

External links

  Diadema Official Site
 Santos FC

Municipalities in São Paulo (state)
1959 establishments in Brazil
Populated places established in 1959